Sven Torsten Fahlman (11 July 1914 – 23 June 2003) was a Swedish fencer who won a silver medal in the team épée event at the 1952 Summer Olympics. He also won two silver and three bronze medals in épée at the world championships of 1947–54.

References

External links
 

1914 births
2003 deaths
Swedish male épée fencers
Olympic fencers of Sweden
Fencers at the 1952 Summer Olympics
Olympic silver medalists for Sweden
Olympic medalists in fencing
Sportspeople from Stockholm
Medalists at the 1952 Summer Olympics
20th-century Swedish people
21st-century Swedish people